Brian W. Harrison OS (born 1945 in Sydney, Australia) is an Australian-born Roman Catholic priest and theologian. Harrison is a prolific writer on religious issues and an emeritus professor of theology at the Pontifical Catholic University of Puerto Rico (1989–2007).  He speaks Spanish fluently.  Harrison is also an associate editor of "Living Tradition", a publication of the Roman Theological Forum hosted by the Oblates of Wisdom in St Louis, Missouri, United States, where Harrison currently lives at the order's study center. The forum's website contains many articles by Harrison, including one of the very few serious theological analyses carried out so far regarding biblical and Catholic teaching on torture and corporal punishment.

Background and views 

Harrison was baptised in a Methodist church and brought up in Presbyterianism. He spent a few years with a Lutheran mission in New Guinea, where he became a Roman Catholic in 1972.

Harrison is doctrinally conservative. While opposing some interpretations of the Second Vatican Council allegedly made by progressive and Modernists, he also opposes what he considers excessive criticism of the actual texts of that council by some traditionalist Catholics. His main published work is Religious Liberty and Contraception (Melbourne: John XXIII Fellowship, 1988), in which he argues for the doctrinal continuity (non-contradiction) between Vatican II's Declaration on Religious Liberty (Dignitatis Humanae) and the earlier papal encyclicals on church, state and religious tolerance. He concludes that the kind of doctrinal development represented by Dignitatis Humanae does not, as some have claimed, set a magisterial precedent for more radical changes such as a hypothetical future papal reversal or mitigation of Catholic teaching against contraception.

Harrison is also one of the few young earth creationists among Catholics. However, he does not share the absolute geocentrism of other Catholic creationists such as Robert Sungenis.

Harrison is also an opponent of Sedevacantism and, in 2000, authored a tract entitled A Heretical Pope would Govern Validly but Illicitly. In this tract he based his argument on the 1945 legislation of Pope Pius XII concerning a papal election, Vacantis Apostolicæ Sedis.

The papal legislation declared, in part:

"None of the Cardinals may in any way, or by pretext or reason of any excommunication, suspension, or interdict whatsoever, or of any other ecclesiastical impediment, be excluded from the active and passive election of the Supreme Pontiff. We hereby suspend such censures solely for the purposes of the said election; at other times they are to remain in vigor."

Criticism

Sedevacantists have made rebuttals, claiming to refute the article A Heretical Pope would Govern Validly but Illicitly.

Richard Ibranyi (a sedevacantist author and speaker) wrote against Harrison.

References

External links
Article: "Can an implicit faith in Christ be sufficient for salvation?"
 from the Wayback Machine
Latin text of Vacantis Apostolicæ Sedis
Bio at catholicism.org

1945 births
Living people
Converts to Roman Catholicism
Converts to Roman Catholicism from Calvinism
Roman Catholic writers